The Gorgon Slayer is the seventh novel in World of Adventure series by Gary Paulsen. It was published on September 1, 1995 by Random House.

Plot
The story is about Warren Trumbull who lives in a world where mythological creatures are a fact and often a nuisance. Warren works for an eight-foot Cyclops, Princey, who runs an agency that specializes in dealing with mythological creature removal. Today Warren and his friend Rick are assigned the task of killing a Gorgon residing in the basement of Helga Thorenson.

References 

Novels by Gary Paulsen
1995 American novels
Young adult fantasy novels
American young adult novels